This is a chronological table of metaheuristic algorithms that only contains fundamental algorithms. Hybrid algorithms and multi-objective algorithms are not listed in the table below.

Categories 
 Evolutionary-based
 Trajectory-based
 Nature-inspired
 Swarm-based 
 Bio-inspired 
 Physics/Chemistry-based 
 Human-based
 Plant-based
 Art-inspired
 Ancient-inspired

The table

References 

Metaheuristics